Ross McQuillan is an Ulster-born shooter and has won the Irish Open twice. He was also on the GB Palma Team  that won the World Long Range Championships in Canada in 2007, with the second highest score on that team. He is now Irish Short Range Captain, effective 2010.

References

Living people
Year of birth missing (living people)
British male sport shooters
Shooters at the 2010 Commonwealth Games
Commonwealth Games competitors for Northern Ireland